A Lad an' a Lamp is a 1932 Our Gang short comedy film directed by Robert F. McGowan.  It was the 119th (32nd talking episode) Our Gang short that was released. The film has been criticized as containing racist humor.

Plot
Fascinated by the story of Aladdin and his magic lamp, the gang gather together with several gasoline and kerosene lamps and lanterns and a few electric lamps hoping that by rubbing them vigorously, a genie will appear. Thanks to a series of coincidences—not least of which involves a friendly stage magician—the kids become convinced that they have succeeded in invoking Aladdin. But their excitement turns to dismay when Stymie believes Spanky has transformed his kid brother Cotton into a monkey (chimpanzee).

Cast

The Gang
 Matthew Beard as Stymie
 Dorothy DeBorba as Dorothy
 Bobby Hutchins as Wheezer
 George McFarland as Spanky
 Dickie Moore as Dick
 Bobbie Beard as Cotton
 Georgie Billings as Georgie
 Dickie Jackson as Dickie
 John Collum as Uh-huh
 Bobby DeWar as Our Gang member
 Henry Hanna as Our Gang member
 Pete the Pup as himself

Additional cast
 Donald Haines as Toughie
 Harry Bernard as Officer / Store proprietor (scene deleted)
 Dick Gilbert as Officer / Dick, construction worker
 Jack Hill as Audience member / Officer
 Florence Hoskins as Cook's girlfriend
 James C. Morton as Officer
 Lillian Rich as Introductory narrator
 Philip Sleeman as The Magician
 Charley Young - Fruit vendor
 Jiggs the Chimpanzee as himself
 Harry Bowen as Audience member
 Efe Jackson as Pedestrian
 Jim Mason - Audience member

Cast notes
Bobby Hutchins returns to the fold after missing Hook and Ladder, Free Wheeling, and Birthday Blues.

Critique
Despite a sequence in which Spanky enjoys a free meal at a lunch counter, courtesy of a trained monkey, A Lad an' a Lamp has been criticized as containing racist humor that seems inappropriate when viewed in the 21st century. For this reason, A Lad an' a Lamp has been withdrawn from the "Little Rascals" television package. It is currently available in its entirety on VHS and DVD.

See also
 Our Gang filmography

References

External links

1932 films
American black-and-white films
1932 comedy films
Films directed by Robert F. McGowan
Hal Roach Studios short films
Our Gang films
1932 short films
1930s American films